Forum of Young Global Leaders, or Young Global Leaders (YGL), was created by Klaus Schwab, founder of the World Economic Forum.  The YGL, a non-profit organization managed from Geneva, Switzerland, is under the supervision of the Swiss government.

History
The program was founded by Klaus Schwab of the World Economic Forum in 1993 under the name “Global Leaders for Tomorrow” and was renamed to Young Global Leaders in 2004.

Schwab created the group with $1 million won from the Dan David Prize, and the inaugural 2005 class comprised 237 young leaders.

Reception
BusinessWeek's Bruce Nussbaum describes the Young Global Leaders as "the most exclusive private social network in the world", while the organization itself describes the selected leaders as representing "the voice for the future and the hopes of the next generation".

Selection process
Representing 70 different nations, Young Global Leaders are nominated by alumni to serve six-year terms and are subject to veto during the selection process. Candidates must be younger than 38 years old at the time of acceptance (meaning active YGLs are 44 and younger), and highly accomplished in their fields. Over the years, there have been many hundreds of honorees, including  several popular celebrities, alongside recognized high achievers and innovators in politics, business, academia, media, and the arts.

Michelle Rempel, a Canadian Conservative politician, says she found out she had been selected as a Young Global Leader in 2016 with an email that she thought was a spam, and described a 2017 meeting as "no different in feel from an academic conference, if a bit more global in nature and with more high-profile politicians and CEOs in attendance."

Leaders' projects
In 2007, Young Global Leaders initiated a program called Table for Two and aimed at preventing both malnutrition in developing countries and obesity in developed ones.

In 2010, Young Global Leader Wikipedia and Wikia founder Jimmy Wales and Operation HOPE founder John Hope Bryant (another Young Global Leader) joined Karim Hajj, president of the Casablanca Stock Exchange, to form the Wikia-Operation HOPE Global Money Initiative, which translated a curriculum of personal financial empowerment into local North African dialects of French and Arabic.

References

External links 

 Official website

Awards established in 2004
International awards
Non-profit organisations based in Switzerland
World Economic Forum